The Worms of Kukumlima is a humorous book written by Daniel Pinkwater for all ages and first published in 1981.

Plot summary
Protagonist/narrator Ronald Donald Almondotter, having accepted an internship under his maternal grandfather, Seumas Finneganstein, finds this interrupted by Sir Charles Pelicanstein, his grandfather's friend, and accompanies both from America to Tanzania, in search of an intelligent earthworm documented by gemstone-collector Gordon Whillikers. In Tanzania, they are joined by tour-guide Hassan Kapoora and cook Ali Tabu. At the advice of general-store owner Baba Pambazuka, they pursue intuitively the intelligent earthworm's habitat in the extinct volcano Kukumlima, without set directions. Finding Kukumlima accidentally, they discover Gordon Whillikers a prisoner of the earthworms (now identified with gigantic size), required to annually collect the tiny elephant mice used by the worms to purposes unknown. Having explored Kukumlima, and identified the worms' vocalizations (attributed earlier to ordinary earthworms) as means of contact, they escape the volcanic crater during an eruption partly stimulated by themselves, and return to America, where Seumas patents an adhesive sap used in the escape.

Availability
The Worms of Kukumlima is no longer in print in its original form; but is included in Pinkwater's compilation 4 Fantastic Novels.

References

1981 American novels
American comedy novels
American young adult novels
E. P. Dutton books
Novels set in Tanzania